Joseph Czerwinski (February 15, 1944 – August 14, 1998) was an American legislator.

Born in Milwaukee, Wisconsin, Czerwinski attended the University of Wisconsin–Milwaukee.
Czerwinski served in the Wisconsin State Assembly as a Democrat from 1969 until 1981. He died in Milwaukee.

Notes

1944 births
1998 deaths
Politicians from Milwaukee
University of Wisconsin–Milwaukee alumni
20th-century American politicians
Democratic Party members of the Wisconsin State Assembly